WIPR may refer to:

 Puerto Rico Public Broadcasting Corporation, including:
 WIPR (AM), a radio station (940 AM) licensed to San Juan, Puerto Rico
 WIPR-TV, a television station (channel 6) licensed to San Juan, Puerto Rico
 WIPR-FM, a radio station (91.3 FM) licensed to San Juan, Puerto Rico
 West of India Portuguese Railway Company, a former railway company in what is now India
 World Intellectual Property Review